The rufous-bellied euphonia (Euphonia rufiventris) is a species of bird in the family Fringillidae.
It is found in Bolivia, Brazil, Colombia, Ecuador, Peru, and Venezuela.
Its natural habitat is subtropical or tropical moist lowland forest.

References

rufous-bellied euphonia
Birds of the Amazon Basin
rufous-bellied euphonia
Taxa named by Louis Jean Pierre Vieillot
Taxonomy articles created by Polbot